Porcelanosa Group is a Spanish manufacturer, distributor and retailer of ceramic tiles.  Products include ceramic, porcelain fittings, wall tiles, floor tiles, wood parquet, hardwood, natural stone, mosaics, kitchens, sanitary ware, brassware, bathtubs, shower trays, hydro massage cabins and columns, bathrooms, accessories, and bedroom furniture.

Companies

Porcelanosa Group is made up of eight subsidiary companies:

 Porcelanosa, created in 1973 and focused on ceramic flooring and wall tiles. 
 Venis, 1986, focuses on the production of floorings and wall tiles.
 Gamadecor, 1987: Kitchen, bathroom furniture, accessories and wardrobes. 
 Krion, 1993, a solid surface material used for countertops and facades.
 L’Antic Colonial, 1999, focuses on "natural products" such as stone, marble, ceramics, mosaics and wood.
 Butech, 2001, focuses on tiling, construction materials and systems. Provides building systems like facades, mortars and special adhesives for extreme weather conditions.
 Noken, 2001, focuses on sanitaryware, taps and faucets, bathtubs and showers, bathroom furniture and accessories. 
 Urbatek, 2004, focused on architecture and design projects and provides ceramics suitable for both exterior and interior applications.

References

External links 

 Porcelanosa Official Website

Ceramics manufacturers of Spain
Companies based in the Valencian Community
Manufacturing companies established in 1973
Spanish brands
Retail companies established in 1973
Spanish companies established in 1973